Dorcadion optatum is a species of beetle in the family Cerambycidae. It was described by Jakovlev in 1906.

See also 
 Dorcadion

References

optatum
Beetles described in 1906